France Dejak (20 September 1925, Dolenje Laze near Ribnica, Slovenia  -  September 2003, Cleveland, United States) was a survivor of the Kočevski Rog killings of members of the Slovene Home Guard, repatriated by the British 5th Corps in Carinthia to the Titoist regime immediately after the World War II.

Dejak described the survival and escape many times after the end of the Cold war and he did it in detail for the first time in an interview published by Mladina magazine on 3 November 1989 to journalist Gorazd Suhadolnik.

He, France Kozina, and Milan Zajec were the only ones among the survivors of the mass killing who managed, with the help of the tree, which during the dynamiting slid down into the cave with its trunk still hooked on the edge of the cave, climbed out of it and escaped.

References

1925 births
2003 deaths
People from the Municipality of Ribnica